William of Luxi, O.P. (fl. 1267–1275), also Guillelmus de Luxi or (Luci, Lusci, Luscy, Lexi, Lissi, Lisi, Lyssy), was born in the region of Burgundy, France, sometime during the first quarter of the thirteenth century. He was a Dominican friar who became regent master of Theology at the University of Paris and a noted biblical exegete and preacher.

Biography 

Little is known about William's early life, except that he was most likely born during the first quarter of the thirteenth century in a village south of the city of Auxerre in Burgundy, France. Details about William's entrance into the Dominican Order and his arrival at Paris are unknown. However, he must have shown great academic promise, since he was singled out to continue his theological training at the Priory of Saint James, the Dominican Order's studium generale located in Paris. He subsequently became regent master at the University of Paris after 1260, probably between 1267 and 1275.

While teaching and preaching within the environs of Paris, William found himself embroiled in the second phase of the Mendicant Controversy (1267-1271) and the Averroist Controversy of 1270. Through his sermons he voiced his support for the universal preaching mission of the mendicant orders (particularly the Dominican and Franciscan Orders) and their right to hear confessions publicly, and expressed his disdain for the moral laxity of secular clerics. While at Paris he seems to have had cordial relations with the Franciscans and Saint Bonaventure in particular, since he was invited to preach the second part of a scholastic sermon with Saint Bonaventure at the Franciscan Cordeliers Convent at Paris in 1267, and fondly mentions the death of Saint Bonaventure in a sermon preached on the first Sunday of Lent sometime after 1275 in Paris. His sermons suggest that William was a conservative theologian committed to the principle that philosophers should not attempt to use philosophy to resolve purely theological questions.

Identity and recognition 

From the sixteenth century until modern times, William has been identified as both a thirteenth century French Dominican and a fourteenth century English Franciscan. It was not until the late nineteenth century, when Barthélemy Hauréau published his landmark studies on Latin medieval manuscripts conserved at the Bibliothèque nationale de France, that the shadowy William begins to gain the attention of modern scholars. More recent scholarly publications have done much to shed light on William's contributions as a biblical commentator and preacher, and have confirmed his identity as a thirteenth century French Dominican.

William's biblical commentaries and sermons were copied during his lifetime and enjoyed fairly wide distribution throughout Europe. Within fifty years of his death, William was recognized as an outstanding biblical exegete. In a list of biblical commentaries written by Landolphus de Columna sometime before 1328,  William comes across as a biblical commentator of some repute. In Landolphus' list he is firmly placed within the circumference of an illustrious circle of medieval, biblical exegetes that include Nicholas Trivet, Thomas Aquinas, Dominic Grima, Peter of Tarentaise, Nicholas of Lyra and Hugh of St. Cher.

Writings 

William's surviving corpus of writings are all biblical commentaries or postills and sermons produced between 1267 and 1275, nearly all of which remain in manuscript form.

He is chiefly remembered for his biblical commentaries, upon which "he spent the greatest part of his lifetime searching narrowly into, and expounding the oracles of the Prophets", notes historian Anthony Parkinson. His postills on the Book of Jeremiah, the Book of Lamentations, the Book of Baruch and the Twelve Minor Prophets survive in five medieval manuscripts, and two commentaries, one on the Catholic Epistles and the other on the Book of Revelation, are presumed lost. Although more work needs to be done in order to determine which near contemporary sources influenced his exegetical writings, studies of his commentaries on the Book of Baruch and a number of his biblical prologues suggest that he was influenced by near contemporaries Stephen Langton, a certain Dean of Salisbury (possibly Richard Poore), Hugh of St. Cher, William of Middleton, William of Alton, and possibly John Pecham.

Twenty-eight sermons, sermones de tempore et sanctis, survive in sixteen medieval manuscripts. They are mostly 'school sermons', some of which are 'university sermons' preached at Paris. His sermons provide insight into the third generation of Dominican preachers at Paris and their preaching activity, especially on matters such as pastoral care and moral reform.

Footnotes

Sources

Further reading 

13th-century Latin writers
French Dominicans
Roman Catholic writers
University of Paris alumni
Year of birth missing
Year of death missing